Saint Anna of Kashin (1280 – 2 October 1368) was a Russian princess from the Rurik Dynasty, who was canonized in 1650.

Life

Anna was a daughter of Prince Dmitry Borisovich of Rostov and a great-granddaughter of Prince Vasily of Rostov.  From her earliest years, Anna was brought up strictly Christian. She was taught the virtues of humility and obedience. Her teacher was Saint Ignatius, Bishop of Rostov (died 1288), who was noted for strict selflessness and pacifism. Like all royal daughters of her time, Anna learned different kinds of needlework. When the princess grew up, Princess Xenia of Tver, second wife of Grand Prince Yaroslav of Tver sent ambassadors to Rostov with a request to marry Anna to her son Mikhail. The embassy was successful, and Anna became the wife of Prince Mikhail.

Princess Anna's marriage to Prince Mikhail took place on 8 November 1294 in the Preobrazhensky cathedral of Tver. In celebration of this event, dwellers in the city of Kashin built the Saint Michael Church and the triumphal gates from the local Kremlin to the Tver road, naming the gates also "Mikhaylovsky." In the Kashin Uspensky cathedral a special Feast was established and celebrated annually on 8 November.

Anna and Mikhail had five children:
 Feodora (died in infancy)
 Prince Dmitry of Tver (1299–1326)
 Prince Alexander of Tver (1301–1339)
 Prince Konstantin of Tver (1306–1346)
 Prince Vasily of Kashin (d. after 1368)

In 1294, her father died, and in 1295 a terrible fire destroyed Tver. Soon after that, Anna and Mikhail's first-born daughter, Feodora, fell severely ill and died in infancy. In 1296, another fire destroyed their palace, and the prince and princess were barely rescued. In 1317, a war began between her husband and Prince Yury of Moscow.

In 1318 the princess said goodbye to her husband forever, who was summoned to the Horde, where he was brutally tortured to death on 22 November 1318. Only in July of the following year did Anna hear about her husband's martyrdom. Learning that Mikhail's remains had been brought to Moscow, she sent an embassy there, and her husband's body was transferred into Tver and buried in Preobrazhensky cathedral.

In 1325, her eldest son, Dimitry, was tortured in the Horde.  In 1327, her second son, Alexander, broke the Tartar army, which devastated the duchy. In revenge Uzbeg Khan gathered a new army and destroyed Tver; Prince Alexander was forced to hide in Pskov. For ten years, Anna did not see her son, and in 1339 Prince Alexander and his son Feodor were killed by the Horde.

After the death of Prince Mikhail, Anna carried out an old desire "in silence to work only for God." She took vows in Sofia's monastery in Tver and adopted the name Evfrosiniya. In 1365 the youngest son of the princess, Vasiliy, her only child remaining alive by that time, entreated his mother to move to his principality. The Uspensky monastery was built in Kashin, and there the saint accepted the schema with the name of Anna.

She died of old age on 2 October 1368, and was buried in the cathedral temple of the Blessed Virgin.

Canonization

The name of the Princess Anna was forgotten for many centuries. It was during the 1611 siege of Kashin by Lithuanian troops that Anna appeared to Gerasim, Sexton of the Dormition Cathedral, and it is said that she prayed to the Saviour and Our Lady for the deliverance of her city from the foreigners. Her relics were reported to work miracles.

The synod of the Russian Orthodox Church convened in 1649 and declared her relics worthy of a universal homage. The princess was glorified as a saint. Twenty-eight years later, Patriarch Joachim addressed the Moscow Synod with a suggestion to decanonize her because of the uncommon veneration and esteem for Anna among the Old Believers.

It was traditionally thought the Old Believers chose Anna as their palladium because the princess was represented on icons as making the Sign of the Cross with two fingers, as the Old Believers practiced, rather than with three, as official church policy required after Patriarch Nikon in 1656. However, writings used by the Old Believers show that one of the reasons they venerated her so highly was that her incorrupt body, on display, showed her hand in the two-fingered Sign of the Cross favoured by the Old Believers, vindicating their stance. Despite  numerous efforts of the Church authorities to "correct" the situation, her hand always went back to the same two-fingered position. In response, Patriarch Joachim removed the relics of Anna from public view.

Grand Council of the Russian Orthodox Church, Patriarch Joachim collected, held in Moscow from January to February 1678 decanonization Anna of Kashin: forbade her to pray, and allowed only pray for her - by her serve memorial service.

It was not until 12 June 1909 that the Russian Orthodox Church glorified Anna again and sanctioned a general celebration of her cult. That year a monastic community was dedicated to her in Grozny. A year later, a church was consecrated in her name in St Petersburg.

Bibliography 
  S. Arkhangelov. Житие и чудеса святой благоверной княгини Анны Кашинской, St Petersburg, 1909
  T. Manukhina. Святая благоверная княгиня Анна Кашинская, Paris, 1954

External links
 St Anna at the site of the Eparchy of Tver
 Biography
 Biography
 www.anna-kashin.ru

Date of birth unknown
1280 births
1368 deaths
13th-century Christian saints
13th-century Eastern Orthodox Christians
13th-century Russian princesses
14th-century Christian saints
14th-century Russian princesses
14th-century Eastern Orthodox nuns
Rurik dynasty
Russian nuns
Russian saints of the Eastern Orthodox Church
Russian princesses
People from Rostov
Christian female saints of the Middle Ages
13th-century Russian women
13th-century Russian people
14th-century Russian people
Yurievichi family